Pseudoloxops is a genus of true bugs belonging to the family Miridae.

The species of this genus are found in Europe and Southeastern Asia.

Species:
 Pseudoloxops adamsoni (Knight, 1937) 
 Pseudoloxops amabilis Linnavuori, 1986

References

Miridae